Ticho may refer to:

Ticho, Anna (1894–1980), a Jewish artist who became famous for her drawings of the Jerusalem hills
Ticho, Ernst (1915–1996), Austrian-American psychoanalyst
Ticho, Gertrude (1920–2004), Austrian-American psychoanalyst
Ticho, Gobesa in Ethiopia
Ticho House (Hebrew: בית טיכו, Beit Tikho) is a historical home in Jerusalem, Israel, now functioning as a museum
Ticho Parly (1928–1993)  Danish Heldentenor who sang leading roles in most of the major opera houses
Ticho (album), by Ewa Farna

See also
Ticho, ticho, ticho (1962)  Lubomír Lipský

External links